Rigg comes from the Scottish word for "ridge", as in the medieval "ridge and furrow" system of farming, or run rig land allocation. It may refer to:

People 
 Archibald G. Rigg (1878-1959), Canadian-born American architect
 Archie Rigg (1872–1951), English rugby union and rugby league footballer
 Bryan Mark Rigg (born 1971), historian of the Second World War
 Clem Rigg (1899–1966), English footballer
 Diana Rigg (1938–2020), English actress
 Edwin Augustus Rigg (1822–1882), 49er, officer in the American Civil War and the Apache Wars
 George Burton Rigg (1872–1961), American botanist and ecologist
 James F. Rigg (July 18, 1915 - July 10, 2004) US Navy Ace pilot
 James Harrison Rigg (1821–1909), English minister
 John Rigg (1858–1943), New Zealand politician
 Keith Rigg (1906–1995), Australian cricketer
 Rebecca Rigg (born 1967), Australian actress
 Richard Rigg (British politician) (1877–1942), British politician
 Richard Rigg (Canadian politician) (1872–1964), Canadian minister and politician
 Sean Rigg (born 1988), English footballer

Places 
 Bailrigg, the home of Lancaster University, Lancashire England 
Bigrigg a village in Cumbria, England
 High Rigg, a small hill in the English Lake District
 Eccle Riggs, a country house in Cumbria, England
 Haverigg, a village in Cumbria, England
 Rigg, Dumfries and Galloway, a settlement in Dumfries and Galloway, Scotland
 Rigg, County Fermanagh, a townland in County Fermanagh, Northern Ireland

Fictional characters 
 Officer Rigg, a character in the Saw film series
 Rigg Sessamekesh, the protagonist of Orson Scott Card's novel Pathfinder

See also
Rig (disambiguation)
Riggs, a surname
Rigging

English-language surnames